Emmanuel Ukpai (born 11 October 1987) is a former Nigerian footballer striker.

Career 
He began his career in Togo by Douane FC joined in January 2006 to Boldklubben Frem and played his first game on 14 May 2006 against Lolland-Falster Alliancen. He left after 6 months Copenhagen and moved to Ølstykke FC by the club played 46 matches making 22 goals. Than transferred to Esbjerg fB he left also Ølstykke FC from the second Danish tier in January 2008.

References

External links 
 Esbjerg fB Profile
Tipsbladet Profile

1987 births
Living people
People from Yenagoa
Nigerian footballers
Nigerian expatriate footballers
Boldklubben Frem players
Ølstykke FC players
Esbjerg fB players
HB Køge players
Nigerian expatriate sportspeople in Denmark
Danish Superliga players
Expatriate men's footballers in Denmark
Association football forwards
B68 Toftir players
FC Fyn players